Haris Ibrahimovic (born 17 February 1998) is a Finnish footballer who plays as a midfielder, winger, or forward for Dekani.

Career

Ibrahimovic started his career with Israeli top flight side Ashdod after trialing for Werder Bremen in the German Bundesliga, where he made 2 appearances and scored 0 goals. On 6 August 2016, he debuted for Ashdod during a 2–2 draw with Hapoel Ashkelon. Before the 2017 season, Ibrahimovic signed for Finnish fourth division club HIFK 2, helping them earn promotion to the Finnish third division. Before the 2019 season, he signed for Tampere United in the Finnish third division after trialing for Italian team Massese. In 2020, he signed for FC Oberneuland in the German fourth division. In 2021, Ibrahimovic signed for Slovenian second division outfit Dekani.

References

External links
 

Finnish footballers
Association football wingers
Association football forwards
Living people
1998 births
FC Oberneuland players
Regionalliga players
F.C. Ashdod players
Kakkonen players
Kolmonen players
Slovenian Second League players
Tampere United players
FC Espoo players
Expatriate footballers in Germany
Finnish expatriate sportspeople in Israel
Finnish expatriate sportspeople in Germany
Expatriate footballers in Slovenia
Finnish people of Bosnia and Herzegovina descent
Finnish expatriate footballers
Expatriate footballers in Israel
Association football midfielders
Footballers from Tampere